Five warships of Sweden have been named Draken, after Draken:

 , a warship launched in 1595.
 , a warship launched in 1926 and ran aground in 1677.
 , a galley launched in 1717.
 , a  launched in 1926 and stricken in 1948.
 , a  launched in 1960 and stricken in 1982.

Swedish Navy ship names